Angelus (also called Angelus News) is a weekly Catholic magazine published jointly by The Tidings Corporation and the Archdiocese of Los Angeles, the most populous diocese in the United States.

The magazine began publication in 1895 as a newspaper named The Tidings and is the oldest continuously published Catholic periodical on the west coast of the United States. It is also the oldest weekly periodical in the Los Angeles market. 

The last issue of The Tidings was published in June 2016; in July 2016, it was transformed into the multimedia news platform Angelus (aka Angelus News).

Circulation and archives 
The archdiocese reported that The Tidings reached 230,000 adult readers every week. 

The newspaper's online archive was lost in the migration from the-tidings.com domain to the angelusnews.com domain.

Writers 
The magazine regularly or frequently features columns written by the following, among others:

Archbishop José H. Gómez
Kathryn Jean Lopez
Mike Aquilina
Rev. Ronald Rolheiser ("In Exile")
Greg Erlandson
Heather King ("The Crux")
John L. Allen Jr.
Robert Brennan
Dr. Grazie Pozo Christie
Bishop Robert Barron
Scott Hahn ("Sunday Readings")

Sources
The Tidings: About The Tidings (archived at Internet Archive)
The Tidings: Media Kit (archived at Internet Archive)

References

External links

archive of The Tidings official home page at Internet Archive

Magazines published in Los Angeles
Publications established in 1895
Roman Catholic Archdiocese of Los Angeles
Catholic magazines published in the United States